Zhang Youqi (18 September 1934 – 23 September 2022) was a Chinese scientist who was a professor at South China University of Technology, a former vice president of the University of Hong Kong, and an academician of the Chinese Academy of Sciences.

Biography
Zhang was born in British Hong Kong, on 18 September 1934, while his ancestral home in Xinhui District of Jiangmen, Guangdong. He attended the Queen's College, Hong Kong. He was accepted to the Faculty of Medicine, University of Hong Kong but soon dropped out. In 1954, he entered South China University of Technology, where he majored in civil engineering. After graduating in 1958, he was assigned as a technician to Henan Architectural Design Institute in Zhengzhou, capital of north China's Henan province.

Zhang returned to British Hong Kong in 1961 and was admitted to the University of Wales, where he earned his doctor's degree in 1964. In 1967, he was recruited as an associate professor than full professor of the University of Calgary in Canada. He went on to receive his Doctor of Science degree from the University of Wales in 1973. He joined the faculty of the University of Hong Kong in August 197, becoming dean of the Faculty of Engineering the next year. In 1979, he entered the University of Adelaide where he received his Doctor of Engineering degree in 1982. In 1988, he rose to become vice president of the University of Hong Kong, and served until 1998. In November 2001, he was hired as a professor of South China University of Technology.

On 23 September 2022, he died in Hong Kong, at the age of 88.

Honours and awards
 1987 Fellow of the Royal Academy of Engineering
 1990 State Natural Science Award (Second Class) for the development and application of the finite strip method
 1995 British Empire Medal (ODE)
 1999 Member of the Chinese Academy of Sciences (CAS)
 1999 State Natural Science Award (Third Class) for the incremental harmonic balance method and generalized perturbation methods for strongly non-linear vibration
 2002 Fellow of the Royal Society of Canada
 2003 Silver Bauhinia Star
 2003 Myklestad Prize by the American Society of Mechanical Engineers (ASME)

References

1934 births
2022 deaths
Scientists from Guangdong
South China University of Technology alumni
Alumni of the University of Wales
University of Adelaide alumni
Academic staff of the University of Calgary
Academic staff of the University of Hong Kong
Academic staff of the South China University of Technology
Members of the Chinese Academy of Sciences
Fellows of the Royal Academy of Engineering
Fellows of the Royal Society of Canada